This list ranks skyscrapers in the U.S. city of Syracuse, New York, by height.

Since its construction in 1927, the State Tower Building has been the tallest building in Syracuse. There has not been a new tall building complete in the city since the 1970s and several projects for tall buildings cancelled before completion.

Cancelled buildings

On that date a steel beam was driven into the Carousel Center parking lot. Over the next three weeks, over 40 more pilings were driven, but by December 2 construction had stopped. In July 2008 construction had restarted, and by August three stories of steel framework had been erected.

OnCenter Convention Center Marriott Hotel was a planned 12- or 16-floor building, ] in 2004 and eventually cancelled.

In 2001 Clinton Square North Tower was a planned 16-floor,  complex built alongside Chase Tower and eventually cancelled.

See also
List of Syracuse University buildings
List of tallest buildings in Upstate New York

References

 
Syracuse, New York
 
Buildings
Syracuse